This is a list of the mammal species recorded in Tunisia. Of the mammal species in Tunisia, three are critically endangered, three are endangered, nine are vulnerable, and two are near threatened. One of the species listed for Tunisia can no longer be found in the wild.

The following tags are used to highlight each species' conservation status as assessed by the International Union for Conservation of Nature:

Order: Macroscelidea (elephant shrews) 

Often called sengis, the elephant shrews or jumping shrews are native to southern Africa. Their common English name derives from their elongated flexible snout and their resemblance to the true shrews.

Family: Macroscelididae (elephant shrews)
Genus: Elephantulus
North African elephant shrew, E. rozeti

Order: Rodentia (rats and mice) 

Rodents make up the largest order of mammals, with over 40% of mammalian species. They have two incisors in the upper and lower jaw which grow continually and must be kept short by gnawing.
Suborder: Hystricognathi
Family: Hystricidae (Old World porcupines)
Genus: Hystrix
Crested porcupine, H. cristata 
Suborder: Sciurognathi
Family: Gliridae (dormice)
Subfamily: Leithiinae
Genus: Eliomys
Asian garden dormouse, E. melanurus 
Family: Dipodidae (jerboas)
Subfamily: Dipodinae
Genus: Jaculus
 Lesser Egyptian jerboa, Jaculus jaculus 
 Greater Egyptian jerboa, Jaculus orientalis 
Family: Muridae (mice, rats, voles, gerbils, hamsters, etc.)
Subfamily: Gerbillinae
Genus: Dipodillus
 North African gerbil, Dipodillus campestris 
Genus: Gerbillus
 Anderson's gerbil, Gerbillus andersoni 
 Lesser Egyptian gerbil, Gerbillus gerbillus 
 Pygmy gerbil, Gerbillus henleyi 
 James's gerbil, Gerbillus jamesi 
 Lataste's gerbil, Gerbillus latastei 
 Balochistan gerbil, Gerbillus nanus 
 Lesser short-tailed gerbil, Gerbillus simoni 
 Tarabul's Gerbil, Gerbillus tarabuli 
Genus: Meriones
 Libyan jird, Meriones libycus 
 Shaw's jird, Meriones shawi 
Genus: Pachyuromys
 Fat-tailed gerbil, Pachyuromys duprasi 
Genus: Psammomys
 Fat sand rat, Psammomys obesus 
 Thin sand rat, Psammomys vexillaris 
Subfamily: Murinae
Genus: Apodemus
 Wood mouse, Apodemus sylvaticus 
Genus: Lemniscomys
 Barbary striped grass mouse, Lemniscomys barbarus 
Genus: Mus
 Algerian mouse, Mus spretus 
Family: Ctenodactylidae
Genus: Ctenodactylus
 Common gundi, Ctenodactylus gundi

Order: Lagomorpha 

Family: Leporidae (rabbits and hares)
Genus: Lepus
Cape hare, L. capensis

Order: Erinaceomorpha (hedgehogs and gymnures) 

The order Erinaceomorpha contains a single family, Erinaceidae, which comprise the hedgehogs and gymnures. The hedgehogs are easily recognised by their spines while gymnures look more like large rats.

Family: Erinaceidae (hedgehogs)
Subfamily: Erinaceinae
Genus: Atelerix
 North African hedgehog, Atelerix algirus 
Genus: Hemiechinus
 Desert hedgehog, Hemiechinus aethiopicus

Order: Soricomorpha (shrews, moles, and solenodons) 

The "shrew-forms" are insectivorous mammals. The shrews and solenodons closely resemble mice while the moles are stout-bodied burrowers.

Family: Soricidae (shrews)
Subfamily: Crocidurinae
Genus: Crocidura
 Whitaker's shrew, Crocidura whitakeri 
Genus: Suncus
 Etruscan shrew, Suncus etruscus

Order: Chiroptera (bats) 

The bats' most distinguishing feature is that their forelimbs are developed as wings, making them the only mammals capable of flight. Bat species account for about 20% of all mammals.
Family: Vespertilionidae
Subfamily: Myotinae
Genus: Myotis
Long-fingered bat, M. capaccinii 
Geoffroy's bat, M. emarginatus 
 Felten's myotis, Myotis punicus 
Subfamily: Vespertilioninae
Genus: Eptesicus
 Serotine bat, Eptesicus serotinus 
Genus: Hypsugo
Savi's pipistrelle, H. savii 
Genus: Otonycteris
 Desert long-eared bat, Otonycteris hemprichii 
Genus: Pipistrellus
 Kuhl's pipistrelle, Pipistrellus kuhlii 
 Common pipistrelle, Pipistrellus pipistrellus 
 Rüppell's pipistrelle, Pipistrellus rueppelli 
Subfamily: Miniopterinae
Genus: Miniopterus
Common bent-wing bat, M. schreibersii 
Family: Rhinopomatidae
Genus: Rhinopoma
 Egyptian mouse-tailed bat, R. cystops 
 Lesser mouse-tailed bat, R. hardwickei 
Family: Rhinolophidae
Subfamily: Rhinolophinae
Genus: Rhinolophus
Blasius's horseshoe bat, R. blasii 
Mediterranean horseshoe bat, R. euryale 
Greater horseshoe bat, R. ferrumequinum 
Lesser horseshoe bat, R. hipposideros 
Mehely's horseshoe bat, R. mehelyi 
Subfamily: Hipposiderinae
Genus: Asellia
 Trident leaf-nosed bat, Asellia tridens

Order: Cetacea (whales) 

The order Cetacea includes whales, dolphins and porpoises. They are the mammals most fully adapted to aquatic life with a spindle-shaped nearly hairless body, protected by a thick layer of blubber, and forelimbs and tail modified to provide propulsion underwater.

Suborder: Mysticeti
Family: Balaenopteridae
Genus: Balaenoptera
 Common minke whale, Balaenoptera acutorostrata 
 Fin whale, Balaenoptera physalus 
Subfamily: Megapterinae
Genus: Megaptera
 Humpback whale, Megaptera novaeangliae 
Family: Balaenidae
Genus: Eubalaena
 North Atlantic right whale, Eubalaena glacialis  (possible)
Suborder: Odontoceti
Superfamily: Platanistoidea
Family: Delphinidae (marine dolphins)
Genus: Steno
 Rough-toothed dolphin, Steno bredanensis 
Genus: Delphinus
 Short-beaked common dolphin, Delphinus delphis 
Genus: Orcinus
 Orca, Orcinus orca 
Genus: Pseudorca 
 False killer whale, Pseudorca crassidens 
Genus: Globicephala
 Long-finned pilot whale, Globicephala melas 
Genus: Grampus 
 Risso's dolphin, Grampus griseus 
Genus: Stenella 
 Striped dolphin, Stenella coeruleoalba 
Genus Tursiops
 Common bottlenose dolphin, Tursiops truncatus 
Family Physeteridae (sperm whales)
Genus: Physeter
 Sperm whale, Physeter catodon 
Superfamily Ziphioidea (beaked whales) 
Family Ziphidae 
Genus: Ziphius 
Cuvier's beaked whale, Ziphius cavirostris

Order: Carnivora (carnivorans) 

There are over 260 species of carnivorans, the majority of which feed primarily on meat. They have a characteristic skull shape and dentition.

Suborder: Feliformia
Family: Felidae (cats)
Subfamily: Felinae
Genus: Caracal
Caracal, C. caracal 
Genus: Felis
African wildcat, F. lybica 
Genus: Leptailurus
Serval, L. serval  reintroduced
Family: Viverridae
Subfamily: Viverrinae
Genus: Genetta
Common genet, G. genetta 
Family: Herpestidae (mongooses)
Genus: Herpestes
Egyptian mongoose, H. ichneumon 
Family: Hyaenidae (hyaenas)
Genus: Hyaena
Striped hyena, H. hyaena 
Suborder: Caniformia
Family: Canidae (dogs, foxes)
Genus: Canis
African golden wolf, C. lupaster 
Genus: Vulpes
Rüppell's fox, V. rueppellii 
Red fox, V. vulpes 
Fennec fox, V. zerda 
Family: Mustelidae (mustelids)
Genus: Ictonyx
Saharan striped polecat, Ictonyx libyca 
Genus: Lutra
Eurasian otter, L. lutra 
Family: Phocidae (earless seals)
Genus: Monachus
Mediterranean monk seal, M. monachus  possibly extirpated

Order: Artiodactyla (even-toed ungulates) 

The even-toed ungulates are ungulates whose weight is borne about equally by the third and fourth toes, rather than mostly or entirely by the third as in perissodactyls. There are about 220 artiodactyl species, including many that are of great economic importance to humans.
Family: Suidae (pigs)
Subfamily: Suinae
Genus: Sus
Wild boar, S. scrofa 
Family: Cervidae (deer)
Subfamily: Cervinae
Genus: Cervus
 Red deer, C. elaphus 
 Barbary stag, C. e. barbarus 
Family: Bovidae (cattle, antelope, sheep, goats)
Subfamily: Antilopinae
Genus: Gazella
Cuvier's gazelle, G. cuvieri 
 Dorcas gazelle, G. dorcas 
 Rhim gazelle, G. leptoceros 
Subfamily: Caprinae
Genus: Ammotragus
 Barbary sheep, A. lervia 
Subfamily: Hippotraginae
Genus: Oryx
 Scimitar oryx, O. dammah  vagrant

Extinct 
The following species are locally extinct in the country:
 Addax, Addax nasomaculatus. Though the last animal disappeared in 1932, it has been successfully reintroduced since 2007 from specimens from Niger and others kept in zoos. It was able to reproduce in the wild and even able to multiply outside of the fenced enclosure of the large national park where it had been reintroduced.
 Hartebeest, Alcelaphus buselaphus
 Aurochs, Bos primigenius
 North African elephant, Loxodonta africana pharaohensis
 Barbary macaque, Macaca sylvanus
 Dama gazelle, Nanger dama
 Lion, Panthera leo
 Leopard, Panthera pardus
 Brown bear, Ursus arctos

See also
Wildlife of Tunisia
List of chordate orders
Lists of mammals by region
List of prehistoric mammals
Mammal classification
List of mammals described in the 2000s

References

External links

Tunisia
Tunisia
Mammals